Yoon Mi-ra (born December 18, 1951) is a South Korean actress.

Filmography

Film

Television series

Awards and nominations

References

External links 
 
 
 

1951 births
Living people
20th-century South Korean actresses
21st-century South Korean actresses
South Korean film actresses
South Korean television actresses
Best Actress Paeksang Arts Award (film) winners